Stefan Babović (Serbian Cyrillic: Стефан Бабовић; born 7 January 1987) is a Serbian former professional footballer who played as a deep-lying playmaker. He is the current chief operations officer (COO) of Victoria Group.

During his footballing career, Babović represented seven clubs, most notably Partizan with 157 appearances and 26 goals across all competitions in three separate spells. He also played abroad in France, the Netherlands, and Spain.

After representing his country at all youth levels, Babović made his full international debut for Serbia in late 2007. He earned three more caps the following year, his last national team appearances at only 21 years of age.

Club career

Partizan and OFK Beograd
Babović came through the youth ranks at Partizan and made his senior debut at the age of 17, coming on as a substitute in a 3–0 home win over Sutjeska Nikšić on 17 March 2004. He also spent some time with affiliated club Teleoptik on dual registration. On 8 January 2005, a day after his 18th birthday, Babović signed his first professional contract with Partizan, on a five-year deal. He was also a member of the team that won the league title in 2005. After the retirement of Dragan Ćirić, Babović was given the number 10 shirt. He played 23 league matches and scored three goals in the 2005–06 season. In August 2006, Babović eventually left Partizan after a disagreement with manager Miodrag Ješić.

After parting ways with Partizan, Babović joined OFK Beograd as a free agent, penning a four-year contract. He quickly fit into a talented team and played great for the club, which coincided with his prolific performances for the youth national team.

Nantes and Feyenoord
On 13 December 2007, it was announced that Babović moved to France to join Ligue 2 club Nantes. The transfer officially went through on 1 January 2008. During his first six months at the Stade de la Beaujoire, Babović made 15 league appearances, scoring no goals, as the club won promotion to the Ligue 1. He repeated the same performances in the next season, but the club failed to avoid relegation.

On 1 September 2009, after featuring in Nantes' first three league matches of the campaign, Babović was sent on loan to Feyenoord until the end of the 2009–10 season, with a buyout clause. He was given the number 15 shirt. On 1 November 2009, Babović was sent off during the Klassieker in Amsterdam for elbowing Ajax defender Jan Vertonghen.

After serving his suspension, Babović returned to the lineup for the match against Groningen and scored his first Eredivisie goal, an equalizer in a 3–1 victory. At the end of the season, it was announced that Feyenoord would not offer Babović a new contract. Eventually, Babović returned to France and terminated his contract with Nantes by mutual agreement in June 2010.

Return to Partizan
On 16 August 2010, after almost two months of training with his parent club, Babović eventually signed a two-year contract with Partizan. He scored eight league goals in his comeback season with the Crno-beli, being named in the 2010–11 SuperLiga Team of the Season, thus helping them win their fourth title in a row. In European competitions, Babović recorded four appearances in the group stage of the UEFA Champions League, as the club finished bottom of the table. He also scored two goals in four games in the Serbian Cup, helping Partizan win the trophy.

In the following 2011–12 season, Babović won his second consecutive championship with Partizan, while earning a place in the SuperLiga Team of the Season for the second time in a row.

Zaragoza and Voždovac
In August 2012, Babović signed a three-year deal with Zaragoza. He made his official debut for the club in a 0–2 away loss to Real Sociedad on 16 September 2012. Over the course of the 2012–13 season, Babović made nine league appearances, only to have his contract annulled in the summer of 2013, following the club's relegation from the Primera División.

On the last day of the 2013 summer transfer window, Babović signed with Voždovac on a free transfer. He made 21 league appearances and scored three times in the 2013–14 season, as the club finished in 7th place in their comeback season in the top flight. Despite transfer speculation in the summer of 2014, Babović eventually stayed and spent another six months at Voždovac.

Third stint at Partizan
On 14 January 2015, Babović officially returned to his former club Partizan. He signed a three-year contract and was given the number 10 shirt, previously worn by the departing Ismaël Béko Fofana. On 21 February 2015, Babović made his third debut for Partizan, playing the full 90 minutes in a home league fixture against his former club Voždovac; the game ended in a 3–3 draw. He scored his first goal for the club in a 2–2 away draw with Čukarički on 22 March 2015. Babović recorded a total of 12 league appearances and scored two goals in the second part of the 2014–15 season, as the club won the title. He was again named in the competition's best eleven due to his performances throughout the season for both Voždovac and Partizan.

On 14 July 2015, Babović netted his first goal in UEFA competitions, scoring from a free kick to give his team a 1–0 win over Dila Gori. He also scored the opener in a 4–2 home victory over Steaua București on 5 August 2015.

On 14 January 2016, Babović terminated his contract with Partizan by mutual consent.

International career

A former Serbia and Montenegro U17 and U19 international, Babović was unused substitute in the 2006 UEFA European Under-21 Championship in Portugal. He was subsequently Serbia's top scorer during the 2007 UEFA U21 Championship qualifying stage; two of his three goals came in the stunning play-off comeback against Sweden. In the summer of 2007, Babović was named in the 23-man squad for the final tournament held in the Netherlands. Serbia ended the tournament as a runner-up, losing 1–4 to the hosts in the final.

After appearing in an unofficial friendly against the Basque Country in December 2006, Babović made his official debut for the senior national team under Javier Clemente in a rescheduled UEFA Euro 2008 qualifier against Kazakhstan on 24 November 2007. The match ended with a 1–0 victory for Serbia. He later appeared in three friendlies under newly appointed manager Miroslav Đukić in 2008.

Post-playing career
In November 2017, Babović was appointed chief operations officer (COO) of Serbian holding company Victoria Group.

Statistics

Club

International

Honours

Club
Partizan
 Serbian SuperLiga: 2004–05, 2010–11, 2011–12, 2014–15
 Serbian Cup: 2010–11

International
Serbia
 UEFA Under-21 Championship: Runner-up 2007

Individual
 Serbian SuperLiga Team of the Season: 2010–11, 2011–12, 2014–15

Notes

References

External links

 
 
 
 

Association football midfielders
Eredivisie players
Expatriate footballers in France
Expatriate footballers in Spain
Expatriate footballers in the Netherlands
FC Nantes players
Feyenoord players
First League of Serbia and Montenegro players
FK Partizan players
FK Teleoptik players
FK Voždovac players
La Liga players
Ligue 1 players
Ligue 2 players
OFK Beograd players
People from Berane
Real Zaragoza players
Serbia and Montenegro footballers
Serbia and Montenegro under-21 international footballers
Serbia international footballers
Serbia under-21 international footballers
Serbian expatriate footballers
Serbian expatriate sportspeople in France
Serbian expatriate sportspeople in Spain
Serbian expatriate sportspeople in the Netherlands
Serbian footballers
Serbian SuperLiga players
Serbs of Montenegro
1987 births
Living people